Catastrophe Keeps Us Together is the fifth studio album by American indie rock band Rainer Maria. It was promoted with a US tour in April and May 2006. In September 2006, they appeared at Denver Fest II. Two months later, the band broke up, citing "reasons both musical and personal" for the split.

Track listing
All songs by Rainer Maria, except where noted.

"Catastrophe" - 5:33
"Life of Leisure" - 3:26
"Burn" - 4:16
"Bottle" - 2:26
"Terrified" - 2:50
"Cities Above" - 2:21
"Already Lost" - 4:08
"Clear and True" - 2:40
"I'll Make You Mine" - 3:28
"Southpaw" - 3:42
"I'll Keep It with Mine" (Bob Dylan) / [Hidden Track] - 13:59

Personnel
Caithlin De Marrais  – bass, vocals
Kaia Fischer –  guitar 
William Kuehn – drums, design, photography, concept, layout design
Malcolm Burn – producer, engineer, mixing, instrumentation 
 Peter Katis – producer, engineer, mixing
George Calbi – mastering
Spencer Heyfron – photography
Steve Fallone – assistant

Artwork
The artwork for the album was created by overexposing a photo of Austrian poet and novelist Rainer Maria Rilke, who was the inspiration for the band's namesake.

References

Rainer Maria albums
2006 albums